Chapelieria is a monotypic genus of flowering plants in the family Rubiaceae. The genus contains only one species, viz. Chapelieria madagascariensis, which is endemic to Madagascar.

Description
Chapelieria madagascariensis is a shrub growing 1.5 to 3 meters high, or a small tree growing from 5 to 8 meters high.

Range and habitat
Chapelieria madagascariensis is native to Madagascar's eastern coast in Antsiranana, Toamasina, and Fianarantsoa provinces. Its estimated extent of occurrence (EOO) is 23,707 km2, and estimated and the area of occupancy (AOO) is 132 km2. The AOO may be under-estimated due to under-sampling.

It is native to coastal (littoral, sub- or supra-littoral) humid evergreen forest between sea level and 50 meters elevation, where it is found in primary, degraded, and very degraded forests on white or brown sands or clay-sand.

References

External links
Chapelieria in the World Checklist of Rubiaceae

Monotypic Rubiaceae genera
Octotropideae
Endemic flora of Madagascar
Flora of the Madagascar lowland forests